Chee-Chee is a musical by Richard Rodgers and Lorenz Hart based on the 1927 book, The Son of the Grand Eunuch, by Charles Pettit. Chee-Chee opened on Broadway September 25, 1928, and the show closed after 31 performances.

In 1963 vocalist Betty Comden released an album that included some of the songs from the musical.

Synopsis
In 1928 Herbert Fields wrote a libretto based on Pettit's book in which the son of the Grand Eunuch, Li-Pi, and his wife, Chee-Chee, are forced into exile when the Grand Eunuch announces his plan for Li-Pi to become a eunuch and take his father's place as the Grand Eunuch. Chee-Chee is captured and rescued, and Li-Pi is captured and rescued, and finally the musical ends happily.

Musical Numbers
Two acts, seven scenes.

Act I

Scene I: A Corridor in the Palace of the Holy Emperor, Son of Heaven, in the Violet Town of Peking
 We're Men of Brains - Eunuchs
 I Am a Prince - Prince Tao-Tee
 In a Great Big Way - Li-Li-Wee
 The Most Majestic of Domestic Officials (Entrance of the Grand Eunuch) - Ensemble
 Holy of Holies - Li-Pi-Siao, Li-Li-Wee
 Her Hair Is Black as Licorice (Food Solo) - Li-Pi-Siao
 Dear, Oh Dear - Chee-Chee, Li-Pi-Tchou
 Await Your Love (Concubines' Song) - Li-Pi-Siao, Miss Smile of a Rose, Ensemble
 Joy Is Mine - Li-Pi-Tchou
 I Wake at Morning - Li-Pi-Tchou
 Grovel to Earth (Chee-Chee's First Entrance) - Chee-Chee
 Just a Little Thing - Li-Pi-Tchou, Chee-Chee
 You Are Both Agreed (Finaletto Scene 1) - Li-Pi-Siao, Li-Pi-Tchou, Chee-Chee
Scene II: The Road to the Future
 I Must Love You - Chee-Chee, Li-Pi-Tchou
 Owl Song - A Very Narrow Minded Owl
Scene III: A Wayside Tavern
 I Bow a Glad Good Day (Tavern Opening) - Innkeeper, Li-Pi-Siao, Ensemble
 Better Be Good to Me - Li-Li-Wee, Prince Tao-Tee
 The Tartar Song - Tartar Chief, Ensemble
 Chee-Chee's Second Entrance - Chee-Chee
 Finale (Act I)

Act II

Scene I: A Forest
 Khonghouse Song - Li-Pi-Tchou, Ensemble
 Sleep, Weary Head - Chee-Chee
 Singing a Love Song - Tartar Chief, Ensemble
Scene II: Visiting Day at the Monastery of Celestial Clouds 
 Monastery Opening
 Chinese Dance
 Living Buddha (Impassive Buddha) - The Grand Prior
 Moon of My Delight - Li-Li-Wee, Prince Tao-Tee
Scene III: The Gallery of Torments

Scene IV: The Palace
 Finale Ultimo

See also
 Rodgers and Hart

References

External links
 Dominic Symonds, We’ll Have Manhattan: The Early Work of Rodgers & Hart, chapter 8
 Chee-Chee Theatre Program, New York Public Library Digital Collections

Further reading
 Geoffrey Block, The Richard Rodgers Reader (Oxford University Press, 2006), pp 45–47
 Gerald Bordman, American Musical Theater: A Chronicle (Oxford University Press, 2001), pp 492–493

1928 musicals
Broadway musicals
Compositions by Richard Rodgers
Musicals based on novels